Mary Douglas Tindale (19 September 1920 – 31 March 2011) was an Australian botanist specialising in pteridology (ferns) and the genera Acacia and Glycine.

Tindale was born in Randwick, New South Wales, the only child of George Harold Tindale and Grace Matilda Tindale. She attended primary school in New York while her father served as British Ambassador to the United States. She returned to Sydney, Australia to attend high school at Abbotsleigh.

Tindale earned a B.Sc. in Botany with Honours from Sydney University, as well as a master's degree from the same university. She became Assistant Botanist at the Royal Botanic Gardens, Sydney in 1944 and later served as the Australian Botanical Liaison Officer at the Royal Botanic Gardens, Kew from 1949–1951. After completing her Doctor of Science, she was appointed the first principal research scientist at NSW Public Works. She retired from the Gardens in Sydney in 1983 after 39 years of service there.

Tindale died in 2011.

References

Botanists with author abbreviations
Botanists active in Australia
Women botanists
Australian Botanical Liaison Officers
1920 births
2011 deaths
University of Sydney alumni
Australian women scientists
20th-century British women scientists
People educated at Abbotsleigh